Sandile Vincent Mahlangu (born 6 September 1993), is a South African actor and singer. He is best known for his roles in popular TV series namely Single Guys and Isithembiso and his popular film Shaft 6. In 2021 he joined the TV series Scandal as Simo Shabangu.

Personal life
He was born on 6 September 1993 in Middelburg, Mpumalanga, South Africa. He attended Steelcrest High School for education, having been selected to be an electrical apprentice at SAMANCOR Ferrochrome in Middelburg he was sent to do his on the job practicals in the North West, he then later graduated at Tshwane University of Technology (TUT) with a degree in Electrical engineering in 2017. In the same year, he moved to Johannesburg to pursue acting.

Career
He also featured in the popular soap opera Rhythm City in July 2016, where he played the role 'Cash'. His role 'Cheezeboi' in the popular television series Isithembiso became highly popular among the public. Initially recurring, he was promoted to starring cast for Season 2 of the series.

He has featured in several commercials for KFC, Debonairs Pizza, Halls, Sunbet International, Cell C and Stimorol.

In 2017, he played the role of type-A med student 'Siya' in the television serial Single Guys in season two.

In 2018, he starred in the film Shaft 6 alongside Vuyo Dabula and Deon Lotz playing the role of 'Uuta Mazibuko'.

In 2020 he played the role of 'Simo Shabangu' in e.tv television soap opera Scandal! and in the same year, he starred in the highly acclaimed Netflix original How to Ruin Christmas: The Wedding as ‘Sbu Twala’. He reprised his role for the second instalment, tiled ‘The Funeral’.

Filmography

References

External links
 
 

1993 births
Living people
People from Middelburg, Mpumalanga
Southern Ndebele people
South African male television actors
South African musicians
South African male film actors